Karen Lynn Williams is an American diplomat and she was United States Ambassador to Suriname.

Education
Williams received a Bachelor of Arts degree from Drury College and a Master of Science from the National War College.

Career
Ms. Williams is a career member of the Senior Foreign Service. She has been working for the State Department since 1991. She has served at multiple capacities including being the Deputy Chief of Mission at the U.S. Embassy in Guyana, Senior Advisor at the Bureau of Political-Military Affairs and has worked in U.S. embassies in Afghanistan, Kazakhstan and Paraguay.

United States Ambassador to Suriname
On June 28, 2018, President Trump nominated Williams to be the next United States Ambassador to Suriname. On October 11, 2018, the Senate confirmed her nomination by voice vote. She presented her credentials to the President of Suriname on November 20, 2018.

Personal life
Williams speaks Spanish, Russian, and Bosnian.

See also

List of ambassadors of the United States
List of ambassadors appointed by Donald Trump

References 

Living people
Ambassadors of the United States to Suriname
United States Foreign Service personnel
Drury University alumni
National War College alumni
Year of birth missing (living people)
21st-century American diplomats
American women ambassadors
21st-century American women
American women diplomats